The State of Arkansas has a total of eight metropolitan statistical areas (MSAs) that are fully or partially located in the state. Twenty of the state's 75 counties are classified by the United States Census Bureau as metropolitan.

Among these is one of the fastest growing MSAs in the United States, Fayetteville Springdale-Rogers.

Metropolitan areas
The following table lists population figures for the metropolitan areas with their Arkansas counties, in rank of population. Population figures are from the 2016 U.S. Census estimate.

Combined Statistical Areas

There are three combined statistical areas (CSAs) in the state. The Little Rock-North Little Rock, AR Combined Statistical Area includes the Little Rock and Pine Bluff metropolitan areas and the Searcy micropolitan area. The Jonesboro-Paragould combined statistical area was created by the Census Bureau in 2005 and includes the Jonesboro metropolitan area and Paragould micropolitan area. The Hot Springs-Malvern Combined statistical area was created in 2013 which includes the Hot Springs metropolitan area and the Malvern micropolitan area.

Population statistics
The three Combined Statistical Areas in the state are listed in the table below with their populations from the 2016 U.S. Census estimate.

References